Christopher James Drum (born 10 July 1974) is a former New Zealand cricketer who played in 5 Tests and 5 ODIs from 1999 to 2002. Drum attended Rosmini College in Auckland.

Domestic career
Drum played for the Auckland cricket team between 1996 and 2002. He ended his career with 199 first class wickets and 74 limited overs wickets in the domestic competitions.

International career
Drum made his debut for New Zealand against Pakistan in the March 2001, in the second test match. The match was played at Jade stadium. He became the third bowler to take a wicket with his first legitimate ball in Test cricket at this ground when he had Ijaz Ahmed stepping on his wicket before completing his shot.  On 14 January 1999, he made his ODI debut against India and taking his first One Day International wicket by dismissing Sachin Tendulkar  .

Drum was also a member of the New Zealand squad that won a bronze medal at the 1998 Commonwealth Games, which was the only time cricket was included in Commonwealth games. He played his last Test match in April 2002, and retired from all forms of cricket soon afterwards at the relatively young age of 28.

See also
 List of Auckland representative cricketers

References

1974 births
Living people
New Zealand Test cricketers
New Zealand One Day International cricketers
Auckland cricketers
Cricketers at the 1998 Commonwealth Games
Commonwealth Games bronze medallists for New Zealand
People educated at Rosmini College
Commonwealth Games medallists in cricket
Medallists at the 1998 Commonwealth Games